Séamus Cullimore (born 22 July 1954) is a former Fianna Fáil politician from County Wexford, Ireland. He is a former Teachta Dála (TD) and Senator.

In 1987 Cullimore was nominated by the Taoiseach, Charles Haughey to the 18th Seanad Éireann. Two years later, at the 1989 general election, he was elected to Dáil Éireann for the Wexford constituency. He was defeated at the 1992 general election.

References

1954 births
Living people
Fianna Fáil TDs
Members of the 26th Dáil
Members of the 18th Seanad
Politicians from County Wexford
Nominated members of Seanad Éireann
Fianna Fáil senators